David Bičík (born 6 April 1981) is a former Czech football goalkeeper. He lastly played for Sparta Prague.

References

External links 
 
 
 David Bičík at Sparta Prague website

Czech footballers
Association football goalkeepers
Czech First League players
ŠK Slovan Bratislava players
AC Sparta Prague players
SK Kladno players
FC Viktoria Plzeň players
FC Slovan Liberec players
Slovak Super Liga players
Czech expatriate sportspeople in Slovakia
Expatriate footballers in Slovakia
Footballers from Prague
Living people
1981 births
Mersin İdman Yurdu footballers
Süper Lig players
Czech expatriate footballers
Czech expatriate sportspeople in Turkey
Czech Republic youth international footballers
Expatriate footballers in Turkey
TFF First League players
Karşıyaka S.K. footballers